Zheng Yongshan (鄭 永善, born 1972), who also goes by the name of Mie Taniguchi (谷口 充恵), is a Mainland Chinese immigrant in Japan who was convicted of killing two children and sentenced to life imprisonment.

Murders
Zheng moved to Japan in 2004 and married a Japanese man. She lived near Tokyo, Japan.

On February 17, 2006, Zheng was supposed to drive her child, and two of the child's classmates, to school as part of a carpool arrangement. She stabbed the two classmates in the stomach and back with a 20-centimeter, thin, fish-cutting blade. One child, a girl named Wakana Taketomo, was stabbed 19 times; the other, a boy named Jin Sano, was stabbed 13 times. Both children were five years old.

Recovery of evidence and sentencing
A passer-by discovered the body of Taketomo on a rural road; Sano's body was recovered in an irrigation stream. Taketomo was declared dead at 9:45am, shortly after she was taken to the hospital. Sano died around noon at the same hospital. Prosecutors demanded death, but Zheng was sentenced to life imprisonment without parole after she was diagnosed with schizophrenia.

References

1972 births
Living people
Chinese expatriates in Japan
Chinese female murderers
Chinese people convicted of murder
Chinese people imprisoned abroad
Chinese prisoners sentenced to life imprisonment
People convicted of murder by Japan
People with schizophrenia
Prisoners sentenced to life imprisonment by Japan
Chinese murderers of children